Argentina joined the International Monetary Fund (IMF) on September 20, 1956 and has since participated in 21 IMF Arrangements. The first Stand-By Arrangement (SBA) began on December 2, 1958, and the most recent Stand-By Arrangement began on June 20, 2018, and will expire on June 19, 2021. The most recent arrangement approved Argentina to borrow SDR 40,714.00 million, of which Argentina has borrowed SDR 31,913.71 million as of December 10, 2019. Over the past 63 years, Argentina has frequently used the resources of the IMF and holds the record for the largest loan distributed, reaching nearly $57 billion in 2018. However, in 2006 under the leadership of Néstor Kirchner, Argentina was able to pay off its debts, thus escaping Article IV IMF surveillance. In 2016 under the leadership of Mauricio Macri relations between the IMF and Argentina were reestablished due to the continuous decline of the country's GDP, leading to the 2018 arrangement.

2001 Economic Crisis in Argentina 

November 30th marks the beginning of the 2001 economic crisis in Argentina caused by the rising fear at how rapidly the Argentinian peso was being devalued. This crisis was caused in part by the extensive borrowing Argentina implemented during the presidency of Carlos Menem, and the governments dwindling tax revenue. On December 5th, 2001 the IMF made an announcement that they would no longer provide aid due to Argentina's inability to meet the conditionality set by the IMF to receive loans. President Aldolfo Rodriguez Saá resigned shortly after the announcement of Argentina’s default.

2018 Stand-By Arrangement 
The 2018 Arrangement allowed Argentina the option to immediately purchase US$15 billion (SDR 10,614 billion) while the remainder of the funds would be disbursed at the discretion of the Executive Board's quarterly review throughout the three year arrangement period. As of 2018, Argentina is ranked the 24th largest economy with a GDP of US$518,475 million, however, the GDP has continued to decline throughout the Macri presidency. The goals of the 2018 Stand-By Arrangement are "to strengthen the country’s economy by restoring market confidence via a consistent macroeconomic program that lessens financing needs, puts Argentina’s public debt on a firm downward trajectory, and strengthens the plan to reduce inflation by setting more realistic inflation targets and reinforcing the independence of the central bank". Furthermore, the goal of the Arrangement is intended to bolster social spending and continue on the trajectory of spending for healthcare that is currently implemented.

2019 Presidential Election 

As of October 27, 2019, Alberto Fernández won the presidency in the general election (by 48.1% of the vote) against Mauricio Macri among others. Fernández's presidential term begins December 10, 2019. In a 2019 press briefing with the IMF, it is stated that Alberto Fernández "hopes the IMF will help Argentina pay down its debt". Many account Fernández's victory to the economic failures of his predecessor Mauricio Macri and the fear that Argentina may default on their 2018 SBA as they did in 2001 after mass economic decline within their economy.  As of 2019 in Argentina, 25.4% of households live under the poverty line and 35.4% of the general population is living in poverty. Recent telephone communication between the IMF Managing Director, Kristalina Georgieva, and president-elect Alberto Fernández indicate that both parties hope to “pursue an open dialogue for the benefit of the Argentinian people”.

References 

International Monetary Fund relations